Beulah Land is a 1980 three-part television miniseries which aired on NBC.

The Civil War themed series received heavy criticism as being racially offensive as it was being made.  This caused the series' release date to be pushed back from May 1980 to October, and some changes to be made to the script, including one scene where slaves freed in a will instead seemed to want to remain slaves.

The review of the final product were mixed, with the Associated Press calling it successful as a soap opera, "not uplifting, but nicely diverting"; the New York Times review was titled "Pure Corn Pone"; and The Washington Post review was decidedly negative, calling it an "idiotic, inept, cynically exploitative travesty."

The story is set in Georgia, and the production was filmed in Natchez, Mississippi including at the Melrose mansion

All three parts were among the top 10 American prime time television shows for the week of October 6–12, 1980, when they first aired.  Part III was the third most watched program of the week with a 24.4 rating (19 million homes).  Part II was sixth with a 23.2 rating (18 million homes), and Part I was seventh with a 22 rating (17.1 million homes).

References

External links
 

1980s American television miniseries
1980 films
Films directed by Harry Falk (director)